Kızılmescit is a village in the Pülümür District, Tunceli Province, Turkey. The village is populated by Kurds of the Çarekan tribe and had a population of 8 in 2021.

The hamlets of Çaltıyanı, Çatan, Çevrecik, Göl, Göveçli, Kanlı, Kuşhane, Rabat, Tanrıverdi and Uzundere are attached to the village.

References 

Kurdish settlements in Tunceli Province
Villages in Pülümür District